Mitata a small village in the middle of Kythira, is a municipality of areas such as Prininiadika and Sklavinika.

History
In 2006, an earthquake shattered Ayia Triadon making it no longer able to host church services. Mitata is on a cliff side looking over the neighbouring village of Viaradika. There is a cave underneath the Windmill resort called the "Mavri Spilaia" or "Black Cave".

Population
According to the 1991 census, Mitata has a population of 85, down from 181 in 1991. i

Geography
Postal Code: 80200

Tel +30 27360

Altitude: 173 meters

Longitude: 22° 59′ 39.09″ E

Latitude: 36° 14′ 48.94″ N

Notable People
George Miller

References

Villages in Greece